GroundUP Music is an American record label known for recordings in a variety of genres including jazz, world music, folk, rock, and gospel. The label was founded in 2012 by Michael League as a home for his band Snarky Puppy. The roster of acts on the label has since expanded, with several artists and bands being tied to Snarky Puppy and/or members of that band.

The label also coordinates and sponsors the annual GroundUP Music Festival in Miami Beach, Florida. The February event largely features artists recording with GroundUP Music and acts otherwise associated with GroundUP Music artists.

Roster of artists
Source= 

 Snarky Puppy
 Alina Engibaryan
 Becca Stevens
 Bill Laurance
 Bokanté
 Breastfist
 Charlie Hunter
 Cory Henry
 David Crosby
 House of Waters
 FORQ
 Justin Stanton
 Lee Pardini
 Lucy Woodward
 Magda Giannikou & Banda Magda
 Malika Tirolien
 Mark Lettieri
 Michael League
 Michelle Willis
 Mike "Maz" Maher
 Mirrors
 PRD Mais
 Read/McQueen
 Roosevelt Collier
 Sirintip
 The Funky Knuckles

References

American record labels
Jazz record labels
GroundUPmusic albums
GroundUPmusic artists